Marshall Township is a township in Allegheny County, Pennsylvania, United States. The population was 10,080 at the 2020 census. Marshall Township was named for Thomas M. Marshall, who was instrumental in the township's organization. Since the late 1960s it has been home to a large research and business park.

Geography
According to the United States Census Bureau, the township has a total area of 15.6 square miles (40.4 km2), all  land.  It is part of the North Allegheny School district, along with McCandless and the boroughs of Franklin Park and Bradford Woods. The township participates in the multi-municipality Northland Public Library.

Recreation
Recreational areas in Marshall Township include Altmyer Park, Knob Hill Community Park, Warrendale Park and a portion of the Pennsylvania State Game Lands Number 203.

Surrounding neighborhoods
Marshall Township has five borders, including Cranberry Township in Butler County to the north, Pine Township to the east, Franklin Park to the south and Economy in Beaver County to the west. The township also surrounds most of Bradford Woods.

Demographics

As of the census of 2000, there were 5,996 people, 1,944 households, and 1,675 families residing in the township.  The population density was 384.4 people per square mile (148.4/km2).  There were 2,018 housing units at an average density of 129.4/sq mi (49.9/km2).  The racial makeup of the township was 95.90% White, 1.08% African American, 2.22% Asian, 0.07% from other races, and 0.73% from two or more races. Hispanic or Latino of any race were 0.68% of the population.

There were 1,944 households, out of which 51.2% had children under the age of 18 living with them, 79.4% were married couples living together, 5.0% had a female householder with no husband present, and 13.8% were non-families. 11.9% of all households were made up of individuals, and 4.6% had someone living alone who was 65 years of age or older.  The average household size was 3.08 and the average family size was 3.37.

In the township the population was spread out, with 33.7% under the age of 18, 4.5% from 18 to 24, 28.6% from 25 to 44, 25.6% from 45 to 64, and 7.7% who were 65 years of age or older.  The median age was 38 years. For every 100 females there were 100.5 males.  For every 100 females age 18 and over, there were 95.8 males.

The median income for a household in the township was $102,351, and the median income for a family was $109,376. Males had a median income of $84,871 versus $38,917 for females. The per capita income for the township was $42,856.  About 4.7% of families and 5.8% of the population were below the poverty line, including 6.6% of those under age 18 and 6.1% of those age 65 or over.

Government and Politics

References

Townships in Allegheny County, Pennsylvania